The A10 motorway, also known as the Sebeș–Turda Motorway, is a motorway in the central-western part of Romania, connecting the A1 and A3 motorways, between the cities of Sebeș and Turda, also providing access to Alba Iulia and Aiud. It is 70 km long, with a total cost of 420 million euro, which is financed in proportion of 85% from the European Union funds, the rest of 15% being insured from the state budget. The motorway's construction was divided into four lots: works for lots 3 and 4 began on 20 May 2014, whereas for the other two lots began in 2015.

Since 2021, it has been operational on its entire length. Near Oiejdea, however, it is only operational on two lanes, due to a landslide that occurred in the area that was still not resolved. The motorway became fully operational on 19 November 2022.

Sections
The construction was split into the following four segments, the contracts for which have been awarded in December 2013:
 Lot 1: 17.0 km, from the highway entrance near the interchange with the A1 motorway at Sebeș to Alba Iulia North interchange, awarded to the building consortium of Impresa Pizzarotti & Pomponio Construcții SRL, for a cost of 541,739,137 lei. Includes a complex node with A1.
 Lot 2: 24.3 km, from Alba Iulia North interchange to Aiud, awarded to building consortium of Aktor SA & Euroconstruct Trading '98 SRL for a cost of 549,332,493 lei.
 Lot 3: 12.5 km, from Aiud to the Decea interchange, awarded to the building consortium of Tirrena Scavi SpA and Società Italiana per Condotte d'Acqua, for a cost of 420,511,921 lei.
 Lot 4: 16.3 km, from the Decea interchange to the interchange with the A3 motorway near Turda, awarded to Porr Construct SRL and Porr Bau GmbH, for a cost of 470,004,894 lei.

Openings timeline
The Aiud – Turda segment (26.4 km) opened to traffic on 30 July 2018.
The Sebeș – Alba Iulia North segment (14.8 km) opened to traffic on 3 December 2020.
The Alba Iulia North – Aiud segment (28.8 km) opened to traffic on 30 November 2021.

Exit list

See also
Roads in Romania
Transport in Romania

References

External links
Collection of news articles about the motorway (archive)
Map of the planned motorway route
Detailed planning documentation

Motorways in Romania